Palapa is a sweet and spicy Filipino condiment consisting of thinly chopped white scallions (sakurab), pounded ginger (luya pagirison), turmeric (kalawag), labuyo chili (luya tiduk), and toasted grated coconut (niog). It originates from the Maranao people of Lanao del Sur. The ingredients are mixed together and cooked briefly or cooked until somewhat dry. It is immediately stored in sealed jars (garapon) after cooking. It can be used as an ingredient in certain dishes (most notably in piaparan) or used as a condiment after briefly sautéing (usually with a spoonful of condensed milk). Palapa can also be eaten fresh as salad dressing. Palapa is an important cultural symbol of the Maranao people and is a ubiquitous accompaniment at every meal.

See also
 Philippine condiments
Bagoong
 List of condiments
Sambal
Taba ng talangka

References

Condiments
Philippine condiments